Galataria ( and ) is a village in the Paphos District of Cyprus, located 3 km east of Ayios Photios.

References

Communities in Paphos District